Armand Olier (1851 - 17 September 1911) was a French clergyman and bishop for the Roman Catholic Diocese of Tonga. He was in Marzials and appointed bishop in 1903. He died in 1911 in Moafaga, Tonga.

References 

1851 births
1911 deaths
French Roman Catholic bishops
Roman Catholic bishops of Tonga